Fairfax Henry Wheelan (September 27, 1856 – March 26, 1915) was an American businessman, philanthropist, and political reformer. As the chief complaining witness of voter fraud in 1904, he played a primary role in the eventual downfall of San Francisco Mayor Eugene Schmitz and his attorney and political boss Abe Ruef.

Early life and education

Wheelan was born in San Francisco, California, the son of Peter Wheelan and Catherine Frances Baker. Wheelan¹s father built and operated one of the first flour mills in California and was elected to the San Francisco Board of Supervisors and was member of California State Assembly 11th District, 1883-85. His grandfather, John Henry Baker, was the owner of Golden Gate Ranch, later to be known as Baker Beach in San Francisco.

He was educated McClure Military Academy in Oakland and the Christian Brothers School in Dublin. He entered Harvard College in 1875 and graduated in the Class of 1880, which included classmates of future president Theodore Roosevelt and secretary of state Robert Bacon. Fairfax was also a member of the Hasty Pudding Theatricals at Harvard.

Career

After college he returned to San Francisco in 1881 and started a new operation for Wheelan's Mills in West Berkeley. During this time, he served as editor for the Berkeley Beacon and was elected School Director for the Town of Berkeley. In 1886, he opened a new flour mill in San Luis Obispo and eventually settled in Santa Barbara. He later sold out to the Central Milling Company in San Jose, but stayed on as general superintendent. By 1888, he had left Central Milling to become general manager of Southern Mill and Warehouse Company in San Francisco.

In 1887, Wheelan married Albertine Soule Randall, daughter attorney of Albert Gallatin Randall, an original San Francisco 49’er, and member of the San Francisco Committee of Vigilance of 1851  and Anne Soule, in San Francisco May 18, 1887, at Trinity Church.

While in Santa Barbara, Mr. Wheelan was the first president of the Santa Barbara Club in 1892. In 1893 he developed 2 patents related to flour mill operations. He eventually returned to San Francisco in 1894 as vice president of Southern Pacific Milling Company and director of the Salinas Valley Lumber Company.

He and his wife, Albertine, had two sons, Edgar Stow Wheelan, born in San Francisco on April 7, 1888, and Fairfax Randall Wheelan, born in Santa Barbara on August 1, 1891. Wheelan¹s wife, Albertine Randall Wheelan, began what would be a long career as a fine artist, the costume director for stage producer David Belasco, and book illustrator. She is also considered to be one of first women cartoonists in America.

Political reformer

As a director of the San Francisco Merchants’ Association, Wheelan helped led the organization's efforts to end voter fraud, and in 1904 personally challenged illegal ballot stuffing at San Francisco's Almshouse which had been orchestrated by the then Mayor Schmitz's brother and backed by Ruef. The incident eventually led to the indictment and conviction of several election fraud perpetrators.

During this period of turmoil in San Francisco, Wheelan became an important advisor to his former classmate and then United States president Theodore Roosevelt on California party politics. Wheelan warned Roosevelt in the summer of 1905 that, “The cause of good government thought out the Union demands that Mr. Schmitz should not be re-elected to office.”

This influence was noted by then Republican leader George Knight when he was quoted in the Oakland Tribune that, "It is funny that Pres. Roosevelt cannot find anyone in California to consult with except Fairfax Wheelan and Benjamin Ide Wheeler. Both are good men, but are they the only honest citizens of California?"

San Francisco Republican League and 1905 Fusion Party

As part of his reform activities, Wheelan helped form and led the San Francisco Republican League which was made up of the city’s more progressive wing of the Republican Party.

The Republican League consequently joined with the Democratic Party, under the leadership of lawyer Gavin McNab, the Southern Pacific Railroad's Republican organization, and other local leaders, including Fremont Older, editor of the San Francisco Bulletin, in 1905 to create a fusion movement which would challenge Union Labor Party’s Eugene Schmidt, to a two-party race rather have the incumbent mayor win in a "three-corner" fight.

Wheelan and McNab led the effort to identify a consensus candidate for the mayoral election which led to the selection of Harry Baer, the then auditor of the city of San Francisco, who was a Republican. They presented their recommendation to Older, a major power broker, for his approval. Older, fearing a railroad-led pushback, and accused both of unstated illegalities, and, according to historian Walton Bean, Older used "blunt political blackmail" to have Baer's nomination withdrawal and endorse his own choice, John Partridge, a young and inexperienced lawyer with strong support from the railroad leaders.

Though progressive, Fairfax did not want wish to employ Chinese or Japanese in any job relating to distributing the league's flyers.

The Partridge selection, as Ruef had predicted, led to the breakdown of the fusion coalition, and caused a landslide victory for Schmidt's bid for reelection.

San Francisco Earthquake

In the aftermath of the San Francisco Earthquake of 1906, Wheelan became a leader on the Committee of Fifty, an organization created to restore the city, and chaired its Committee for the Sick and Helpless, working closely with his nemesis Eugene Schmitz during the crisis.

Civic life

Wheelan was also a creative force in San Francisco and a popular public speaker. He was one of the founding members of the University Club of San Francisco and served as a president from 1901 to 1903. He was the primary officer of the city's exclusive literary club, the Chit-Chat Club, for sixteen years, and was its leader at the time of the earthquake in 1906. He reported to members that their monthly meeting would continue nonetheless saying, "We see no reason why geology should be permitted to interfere with literature and the pursuit of truth." He was also a founding board member of the Archaeological Society of San Francisco in 1903 at the invitation of Phoebe Hearst, who was its first president.

After the 1906 earthquake, Wheelan maintained his focus on homeless children and was instrumental in creating the first private orphanage funded by the Native Sons and Native Daughters of the Golden West. His work drew attention nationwide and placed San Francisco as a leader in private philanthropy, and in its early recognition of a major social ill. 

In recognition of Mr. Wheelan, the Native Daughters and Native Sons presented the Fairfax H. Wheelan Memorial Fountain to the City of San Francisco on March 4, 1928. The dedication of a children¹s drinking fountain in Jefferson Square, San Francisco, paid tribute to “the late Fairfax Henry Wheelan, originator of an effort which has resulted in those orders finding permanent homes for thousands of homeless children”.

Wheelan died of stomach cancer  in San Francisco on March 26, 1915 at the age of 58.

References

1856 births
1915 deaths
Harvard College alumni
19th-century American philanthropists
19th-century American businesspeople